Kalambe Turf Thane is a census town in Kolhapur district in the Indian state of Maharashtra.

Demographics
 India census, Kalambe Turf Thane had a population of 8691. Males constitute 53% of the population and females 47%. Kalambe Turf Thane has an average literacy rate of 71%, higher than the national average of 59.5%: male literacy is 78%, and female literacy is 63%. In Kalambe Turf Thane, 12% of the population is under 6 years of age.

References

Cities and towns in Kolhapur district